The 2003 ARAG World Team Cup was a tennis tournament played on outdoor clay courts. It was the 25th edition of the World Team Cup and was part of the International Series of the 2003 ATP Tour. It took place at the Rochusclub in Düsseldorf in Germany from May 18 through May 24, 2003.

Argentina were the defending champions but were eliminated in the round robin stage.

Chile defeated the Czech Republic in the final to win the title for the first time.

Players

Red group

Wayne Arthurs (# 22 Doubles)
Lleyton Hewitt (# 1)
Mark Philippoussis (# 67)
Todd Reid (# 298)

Jiří Novák (# 10)
Radek Štěpánek (# 24 Doubles)

Àlex Corretja (# 17)
Carlos Moyá (# 4)
Fernando Vicente (# 52)

James Blake (# 25)
Mardy Fish (# 51)
Todd Martin (# 93)
Graydon Oliver (# 44 Doubles)

Blue group

Lucas Arnold (# 46 Doubles)
Gastón Gaudio (# 29)
David Nalbandian (# 13)

 Fernando González (# 23)
 Nicolás Massú (# 83)
 Marcelo Ríos (# 43)

Tomas Behrend (# 101)
Lars Burgsmüller (# 98)
Michael Kohlmann (# 51 Doubles)
Rainer Schüttler (# 11)

Jonas Björkman (# 8 Doubles)
Thomas Enqvist (# 97)
Magnus Norman (# 82)

Round robin

Red group

Standings

Spain vs. United States

Australia vs. Czech Republic

Spain vs. Czech Republic

Australia vs. United States

Spain vs. Australia

Czech Republic vs. United States

Blue group

Standings

Argentina vs. Sweden

Germany vs. Chile

Argentina vs. Germany

Chile vs. Sweden

Germany vs. Sweden

Argentina vs. Chile

Final

Czech Republic vs. Chile

See also
 Davis Cup
 Hopman Cup

References
 2003 ARAG World Team Cup Draw

External links
 World Team Cup official website

ARAG ATP World Team Championship
Arag World Team Cup, 2003
World Team Cup